Maria Zenaida "Naida" Arteche Benedicto Angping is a Filipina politician. She served as the secretary of the Presidential Management Staff (PMS) from June 30, 2022 to December 2, 2022 in the administration of President Bongbong Marcos. She previously served as representative of Manila's 3rd district from 2007 to 2016.

Background
Before entering politics, Angping as Zenaida Benedicto was a beauty pageant contestant, having been crowned Miss Caltex of 1970 on December 19, 1969.

Angping became a close aide of Leyte Governor Benjamin Romualdez, the brother of Imelda Marcos. She was also a former member of the House of Representatives, representing the 3rd district of the city of Manila from 2007 to 2016. In 2004, she was the supposed substitute candidate for representative to her husband Harry Angping, who withdrew days before the elections; however, his disqualification due to citizenship issues cancelled the substitution. She also ran for a comeback to the Congress in 2019 but lost to her successor, incumbent Yul Servo.

She was selected to head the Presidential Management Staff as its secretary under the administration of President Bongbong Marcos. On December 2, 2022, Angping requested for "some personal time off," which the president granted; she would later officially quit from the post in January 2023 due to personal reasons. She was later nominated by Marcos as Ambassador Extraordinary and Plenipotentiary to the French Republic on January 13, 2023; her nomination was received by the Commission on Appointments on January 17.

Personal life
Zenaida Angping is married to former Manila 3rd District Rep. Harry Angping.

References

|-

|-

Living people
Beauty queen-politicians
Bongbong Marcos administration cabinet members
Filipino beauty pageant winners
Visayan people
People from Manila
Lakas–CMD politicians
Members of the House of Representatives of the Philippines from Manila
Nationalist People's Coalition politicians
Year of birth missing (living people)
Women members of the Cabinet of the Philippines